Christian Sablatnig (born November 2, 1979) is a retired Austrian football defender.

Honours
 Austrian Cup winner: 2000-01
 Austrian Supercup winner: 2001
 Austrian Football First League winner: 2000-01

External links
 

1979 births
Living people
Austrian footballers
Wolfsberger AC players
FC Kärnten players
BSV Bad Bleiberg players
SVG Bleiburg players
SK Austria Klagenfurt players
Sportspeople from Klagenfurt
Footballers from Carinthia (state)
Association football defenders